The Charles M. Schwab House (also called Riverside) was a 75-room mansion on Riverside Drive, between 73rd and 74th Streets, on the Upper West Side of Manhattan in New York City. It was constructed for steel magnate Charles M. Schwab. The home was considered to be the classic example of a "white elephant", as it was built on the "wrong" side of Central Park away from the more fashionable Upper East Side.

History 
The home was designed by an architect with only a modest reputation, Maurice Hébert, as an eclectic Beaux-Arts mixture of pink granite features that made the Vanderbilt mansions on Fifth Avenue look cramped. It combined details from three French Renaissance châteaux: Chenonceau, the exterior staircase from Blois, and Azay-le-Rideau. It took four years to build the home (1902–1906) at a cost of six million dollars.

Schwab's former employer Andrew Carnegie, whose own mansion on upper Fifth Avenue later became the Cooper-Hewitt Museum, once remarked, "Have you seen that place of Charlie's? It makes mine look like a shack."

Schwab was a self-made man who became president of U.S. Steel and later founded Bethlehem Steel Company. Schwab built "Riverside" after leaving Bethlehem, Pennsylvania for New York. The large property was available because it formed half the site of the former New York Orphan Asylum, one of several charitable institutions in the Bloomingdale District that gave way to large projects in Morningside Heights, such as the Cathedral of St. John the Divine and Columbia University's campus. The Ansonia Hotel now occupies the orphans' Broadway frontage. The financier Jacob Schiff had bought the parcel, but—ominously for the social future of the Upper West Side—Mrs. Schiff refused to move to the "wrong" side of Central Park.

Schwab was a risk-taker and later went bankrupt in the Wall Street Crash of 1929. He died comparatively penniless ten years later in 1939, bequeathing the forlorn "Riverside" to the City as a suitably ostentatious official residence for the mayors of New York. It is probable that former mayor Jimmie Walker would have moved into the residence, but, unfortunately for the mansion, Fiorello La Guardia, then the mayor, was reform-minded and turned it down, saying "What, me in that?"

La Guardia's rejection of the mansion sealed its fate, and during World War II, a Victory garden was planted in its once-landscaped grounds. Eventually the many dwellings around the home became overcrowded and Riverside Drive lost whatever affluence and wealth that had existed. By 1947 the house was empty and in 1948 it was replaced by a large, red-brick apartment complex, called the "Schwab House."

References

Further reading 

 

Demolished buildings and structures in Manhattan
History of Manhattan
Houses in Manhattan
Full-block apartment buildings in New York City
Châteauesque architecture in the United States
Buildings and structures demolished in 1947
Houses completed in 1906
1906 establishments in New York City
Upper West Side
Gilded Age mansions